Daryl Mark Stuermer (born November 27, 1952) is an American musician, songwriter, and producer best known for playing the guitar and bass for Genesis during live shows, and lead guitar for Phil Collins during most solo tours and albums. He has also released nine solo albums, and tours with his Daryl Stuermer Band.

Early life
Stuermer was born on November 27, 1952, in Milwaukee, Wisconsin. He cites Duane, his elder brother of two years, also a musician, who introduced him to music by Elvis Presley and Ray Charles. As a youngster he became a fan of the instrumental rock band The Ventures, which "really got me going". He began to play the guitar at age eleven, and moved into jazz guitar four years later. In 1970, Stuermer graduated from St. Francis High School in St. Francis, Wisconsin.

Career

Early bands
In the early 1970s, Stuermer formed his Milwaukee-based jazz rock band Sweetbottom, playing local gigs five nights a week. It was during one of these gigs in 1975 that keyboardist George Duke, then of The Mothers of Invention with Frank Zappa, noticed him and suggested his name to jazz violinist Jean-Luc Ponty, who was looking for a guitarist to join his own band. After a successful audition, Stuermer became a full time member and is featured on three of their albums released between 1975 and 1977: Aurora, Imaginary Voyage, and Enigmatic Ocean.

In addition to Ponty, he played on Duke's solo albums I Love the Blues, She Heard My Cry and Liberated Fantasies.

Genesis

In late 1977, Stuermer, on insistence of friend Alphonso Johnson, was recommended as a replacement for Steve Hackett to support Genesis for live performances. Johnson's audition was unsuccessful, and he put Stuermer's name forward. Stuermer's only exposure to the band was when Ponty played him A Trick of the Tail, and a television clip showing Gabriel singing in costume. A chance meeting with drummer Chester Thompson, who had replaced Bill Bruford as their touring drummer in 1976, convinced Stuermer to go for the audition. His audition with Mike Rutherford took place in early 1978 in New York City, and landed the spot on the same day. He retained the role of lead guitarist and bass player with the band from 1978 to 1992: he also rejoined them for the 2007 Turn It On Again Tour, and returned for the 2021-2022 The Last Domino? Tour.

Solo career
During Genesis's break in activity for much of 1979, Stuermer secured work by touring North America with singer Gino Vannelli in support of his album Brother to Brother.

In 1981, Stuermer followed Genesis frontman Phil Collins as lead guitarist for Collins' solo career, with a speaking part in the clip for "One More Night" and being mentioned by name in the music video for "Don't Lose My Number". In doing so, he transitioned from what Collins called a "permanent-temporary-part-time member" of Genesis to a "permanent-touring-recording member" of Collins' new group. Stuermer is credited as a writer on several songs that Collins recorded, including "I Don't Wanna Know" on No Jacket Required, which evolved from one of Stuermer's demos.

In 1988, Stuermer released his debut solo album Steppin' Out. He considered making it a more vocal-oriented album having performed with Collins throughout the decade, but he opted to produce a rock instrumental album.

Stuermer went on to record Live and Learn, Another Side of Genesis, Waiting in the Wings, Retrofit, The Nylon String Sampler, Rewired: the Electric Collection and Go!. Released in 2002 was a Sweetbottom live reunion album, recorded at Shank Hall in Milwaukee, Wisconsin. 

Stuermer's album Go! was released in early 2007. It contains many older tracks from Stuermer's Sweetbottom days, and includes appearances from Alphonso Johnson, Kostia, John Calarco, and Eric Hervey. Stuermer released the album on Inside Out Records as they offered him greater freedom to explore a musical direction that he wished to pursue. His current project is called Daryl Stuermer - Symphony Concert, which involves band members Kostia, Alan Arber and Eric Hervey and singer Forrest "Woody" Mankowski, recreating classic Genesis material mixed with instrumentals from his solo career.

Equipment
Stuermer has been a Fender Stratocaster user for most of his career with Phil Collins. His primary guitars have been a Torino Red Eric Clapton Stratocaster and a 3-Tone Sunburst American Standard Stratocaster, though he also played banjo on the Collins song "The Roof Is Leaking". In addition to the Fender Stratocaster in his tenure with Collins and Genesis, he played Gibson RD Artist bass guitars and Ibanez electric guitars in 1978. He then switched to a SUNTECH Model SA-MFSC "Stratocaster Style" guitar from 1978 to 1984 and used a Shergold Bass Guitar (1980), a Fender Precision Bass guitar in 1981/1982, a Strata (Status Graphite) bass guitar and a Roland guitar (1983–84), a Steinberger bass guitar and guitar (1986/1987), a Yamaha bass guitar in 1992 and a Lakland custom bass guitar in 2007. Stuermer used a Gibson ES-346 in 2004/2005, and as of 2007 he has largely been using a Godin LGXT electric guitar. He also uses a Godin Montreal Premier, a Godin DS-1 (a custom guitar that Godin built for Stuermer) and a Sadowsky nylon string electric guitar.

Discography
 Solo albums

With Jean-Luc Ponty

With George Duke

With Joan Armatrading

With Frida Lyngstad (ABBA)

With Tony Banks (Genesis)

With Mike Rutherford

With Philip Bailey

With Phil Collins

With Genesis

Collaborations
 1986 : Marilyn Martin from Marilyn Martin - Daryl composed the music for the song Wildest Dreams and plays on it as well.
 2004 : Crossing the Jordan - producer.
 2015 : 1985 from Martin Levac - Daryl plays on the song I am sorry

References

External links
 Official Website

1952 births
Living people
American rock guitarists
American male guitarists
Genesis (band) members
Unicorn Digital artists
Musicians from Milwaukee
Guitarists from Wisconsin
American people of German descent
American rock bass guitarists
American male bass guitarists
American jazz guitarists
Lead guitarists
Songwriters from Wisconsin
American session musicians
American banjoists
20th-century American guitarists
American male jazz musicians
The Phil Collins Big Band members